The 2012 Lehigh Mountain Hawks football team represented Lehigh University in the 2012 NCAA Division I FCS football season. They were led by seventh-year head coach Andy Coen and played their home games at Goodman Stadium. They are a member of the Patriot League. They finished the season 10–1, 5–1 in Patriot League play to finish in second place.

Schedule

Ranking movements

References

Lehigh
Lehigh Mountain Hawks football seasons
Lehigh Mountain Hawks football